Ánimas Trujano (El hombre importante) (The Important Man) is a 1962 Mexican drama film directed by Ismael Rodríguez, based on a novel by Rogelio Barriga Rivas. It stars Toshiro Mifune, Columba Domínguez, Flor Silvestre, and Antonio Aguilar.

The film was nominated for an Academy Award for Best Foreign Language Film.

Plot

The film's setting is a town in Oaxaca during the festival of its patron saint, for which the church appoints a layman as mayordomo or steward, an honor that in effect is gained by being able to organize and cover the high costs of most of the saint's local festivities. The post is however very coveted by the locals as it is socially prestigious.

Ánimas Trujano (Mifune, dubbed by Narciso Busquets) is a drunken, irresponsible peasant who abuses his children and does nothing while his long-suffering wife supports the family. Obsessed with earning the respect which is denied to him by his peers as a result of his behavior, Trujano aims to be mayordomo in the annual festival and begins to do everything he can to get the needed money. After his eldest daughter is impregnated out of wedlock by the son of the local land baron (played by Eduardo Fajardo), Trujano sells the baby to the land baron in exchange for a small fortune that makes him eligible to be appointed mayordomo.

Meanwhile, Trujano's wife (Columba Domínguez) encounters trouble when it is revealed that her husband has been seeing a local woman of dubious morals (Flor Silvestre).

Cast
 Toshiro Mifune as Ánimas Trujano (dubbed by Narciso Busquets)
 Columba Domínguez as Juana
 Flor Silvestre as Catalina
 Pepe Romay as Pedrito (as Pepito Romay)
 Titina Romay as Dorotea
 Amado Zumaya as Compadre
 José Chávez as Brujo
 Luis Aragón as Tendero
 Juan Carlos Pulido as Belarmino
 Magda Monzón
 Jaime J. Pons as Carrizo
 David Reynoso as Criton
 Eduardo Fajardo as El Español
 Antonio Aguilar as Tadeo

Awards and nominations
The film was nominated for the Academy Award for Best Foreign Language Film and a Golden Globe Award for Best Foreign Language Film in 1962.

See also
 List of submissions to the 34th Academy Awards for Best Foreign Language Film
 List of Mexican submissions for the Academy Award for Best Foreign Language Film

References

External links 

1962 drama films
1962 films
1960s Spanish-language films
Films directed by Ismael Rodríguez
Mexican drama films
Mexican black-and-white films
1960s Mexican films